John Donovan McDougall is a British mechanical engineer.

He worked at the Davy Corporation, Whessoe and Sterling Furnaces.
In 1975, he joined WS Atkins Consultants, as a project engineer.   
In 1991, he was promoted to Managing Director. 
He is a Director at Darlington Building Society.

He was President of the Institution of Mechanical Engineers in 2002.

References

Year of birth missing (living people)
Living people
Fellows of the Institution of Mechanical Engineers